Margaret Mary "Peggy" Byrne (born December 17, 1949) is an American politician.

Byrne was born in Minneapolis, Minnesota and graduated from Saint Joseph's Academy, in Saint Paul, Minnesota, in 1967. Byrne received her bachelor's degree in social psychology and criminal justice, from University of Minnesota, in 1975. She then went to the Humphrey School of Public Affairs for graduate work. Byrne lived in Saint Paul, Minnesota and was a policy analyst for the Minnesota State Planning agency from 1983 to 1991 and from 1999 to 2000. She also worked for the Minnesota Department of Children, Families and Learning from 2000 to 2003. Byrne served in the Minnesota House of Representatives from 1975 to 1982 and was a Democrat.

References

1949 births
Living people
Politicians from Minneapolis
Politicians from Saint Paul, Minnesota
University of Minnesota alumni
Humphrey School of Public Affairs alumni
Women state legislators in Minnesota
Democratic Party members of the Minnesota House of Representatives